Moles de Xert is a  long mountain range in the Baix Maestrat comarca, Valencian Country, Spain. Its highest point is Mola Gran (806 m). The other main summits are Mola Murada, a breast-shaped hill, Moleta Redona and Mola Llarga. These mountains have very original shapes, topped by regular rocky outcrops resembling castles or fortifications. They are frequently covered in snow in the winter.

The main mountain, Mola Gran, has been disfigured on the southern side by a stone quarry that left a very visible scarred surface with a large rock slide.

There are remains of an ancient Iberian Ilercavones settlement in the Mola Murada.

Wildlife, like Spanish Ibex, Roe Deer and Wild Boar, is abundant in these lonely mountains.

Location
This mountain chain rises above the town of Xert and right to the NE of Serra de l'Espadella, east of the Maestrat mountains of which they could be considered foothills.

The abandoned villages of La Barcella and Fontanals are located in these mountains.

See also
Maestrat/Maestrazgo
Mountains of the Valencian Community

References

External links

El País Valencià poble a poble; comarca a comarca - El Baix Maestrat
Les Moles de Xert

Mountain ranges of the Sistema Ibérico
Mountain ranges of the Valencian Community
Baix Maestrat